Scopula romanarioides is a moth of the family Geometridae first described by Walter Rothschild in 1913. It is found in Algeria.

References

Moths described in 1913
romanarioides
Moths of Africa